Irina Khromacheva and Demi Schuurs were the defending champions, having won the event in 2011.

Gabrielle Andrews and Taylor Townsend won the tournament, defeating Belinda Bencic and Petra Uberalová in the final, 6–4, 6–3.

Seeds

Draw

Finals

Top half

Bottom half

External links 
 Draw

Girls' Doubles
US Open, 2012 Girls' Doubles